Edward Löwe (also Eduard Loewe; 23 September 1794 – 24 February 1880) was a Bohemian-born, after 1830 naturalized English chess master.

Personal life
Löwe was born in Prague and died in London.

Match and tournament results
In 1847, he won a match with Howard Staunton (5–2), but his opponent gave odds of pawn and two moves. In regular matches, he won against Hugh Alexander Kennedy (7½–6½) in 1849, and lost to Frederick Deacon (2½–7½) in 1851, James Hannah (8–13) in 1857, and Paul Morphy (0–6) in 1858. The match against Morphy took place in Lowe's Hotel, which belonged to Löwe.

In tournaments, he won against Arthur Simons (2–0) and lost to George Webb Medley (1½–2½) at London 1849 (Ries' Divan, Henry Thomas Buckle won), and lost a match to Marmaduke Wyvill (0–2) at the London 1851 chess tournament (Adolf Anderssen won).

References

Sources
Lawson, David (1976). Paul Morphy: The Pride and Sorrow of Chess. David McKay, 1976. .

Further reading

Chess Monthly, 1879–80, p. 255
Chess Player's Chronicle, 1880, p. 86
Deutsche Schachzeitung, 1880, pp. 107, 200–201

External links

1794 births
1880 deaths
Sportspeople from Prague
British people of Czech-Jewish descent
British Jews
Czech chess players
British chess players
Jewish chess players
19th-century chess players